Nebria livida is a species of ground beetle with two subspecies:
Nebria livida angulata Banninger, 1949 
Nebria livida livida (Linnaeus, 1758)

Nebria laticollis angulata is found in China, North Korea, and Russia.

Nebria livida livida is native to the Palearctic realm. In Europe it is found in Austria, Belarus, Belgium, Great Britain including the Isle of Man, the Czech Republic, mainland Denmark, Estonia, Finland, mainland France, Germany, Hungary, Kaliningrad, Latvia, Liechtenstein, Moldova, mainland Norway, Poland, Romania, Russia, Slovakia, Sweden, Switzerland, the Netherlands and the Ukraine.

References

External links

livida
Beetles of Europe
Beetles described in 1758
Taxa named by Carl Linnaeus